The American Basketball Association (ABA) was a professional basketball league that operated from the  until it ceased to exist with the ABA–NBA merger in 1976. The ABA presented a variety of annual awards and honors to recognize its players and executives.

There were six awards presented by the ABA. Three Most Valuable Player (MVP) awards were presented annually in the All-Star Game, the regular season, and the playoffs. In sports, the player judged to be the most important to the team is the Most Valuable Player (MVP). Other annual awards include the Executive of the Year, the Coach of the Year, and the Rookie of the Year. Honors were also presented to players who excelled in the respective categories of: best players, best defensive players, and best rookies. Julius Erving has won the most ABA awards with five MVP awards—three in the regular season and two in the playoffs. Artis Gilmore has won the most ABA honors with nine. A total of 80 ABA players and executives have received at least one award or honor.

ABA championship

The American Basketball Association (ABA) Finals were the championship series of the ABA, a  professional basketball league, in which two teams played each other for the title. The ABA was formed in the fall of 1967, and the first ABA Finals were played at the end of the league's first season in the spring of 1968. The league ceased operations in 1976 with the ABA–NBA merger and four teams from the ABA continued play in the National Basketball Association.

All ABA Finals were in best-of-seven format and were contested between the winners of the Eastern Division and the Western Division finals. The only teams to win the championship more than once were the Indiana Pacers and the New York Nets. The Indiana Pacers initially played in the ABA Finals in 1969, which they lost to the Oakland Oaks, but they won the championship the next year against the Los Angeles Stars. They won in the ABA Finals again in 1972, their first after moving to the Western Division, against the New York Nets and won their final ABA championship against the Kentucky Colonels in 1973. The New York Nets won their first championship in 1974 against the Utah Stars, and their second against the Denver Nuggets in 1976.

The last ABA Finals were in 1976, after which the ABA–NBA merger took place; three of the four teams that continued into the NBA made it to or won the ABA Finals.

Awards

Most Valuable Player

Every player who has won the award has played for a team with at least 45 regular-season wins. The inaugural award winner was Hall of Famer Connie Hawkins. Hall of Famer Julius Erving won the award three times, all with the New York Nets. Mel Daniels won it twice with the Indiana Pacers. Seven of the award winners were capable of playing forward, while six were capable of playing center. With the announcement of McGinnis as a member of the Naismith Memorial Basketball Hall of Fame class of 2017, every ABA MVP has been inducted into the Hall of Fame.

Rookie of the Year
The inaugural award winner was Mel Daniels, who also won two MVP awards during his ABA career. Two Rookie of the Year winners have been elected to the Naismith Memorial Basketball Hall of Fame:  Rookie of the Year Dan Issel and  Rookie of the Year David Thompson.

Coach of the Year

The inaugural award winner was Vince Cazzetta, who coached the Pittsburgh Pipers to an ABA championship. Oakland Oaks coach Alex Hannum won the award the season after, and also coached his team to an ABA championship. Larry Brown won the award three times, and is the only coach to have won the award multiple times. Hannum, Sharman and Brown are the only recipients to have been inducted to the Naismith Memorial Basketball Hall of Fame. Every head coach won the award without a losing record.

Playoffs MVP
The Playoffs Most Valuable Player Award was an annual award given in the ABA Playoffs. The award was first awarded in the 1968 ABA Playoffs, and was retired as part of the ABA–NBA merger. The inaugural award winner was Pittsburgh Pipers' player Connie Hawkins. On all occasions, the player who wins the Playoffs MVP award was from the team that won the ABA championship. Julius Erving, who led the New York Nets to two ABA championships in 1974 and 1976, is the only player to win the award twice.

All-Star Game MVP
The All-Star Game Most Valuable Player (MVP) was an annual award given to the best player of the annual All-Star Game. The award was established in the 1968 All-Star Game, and was retired as part of the ABA—NBA merger. The first recipient of the award was Larry Brown, who scored 17 points in a losing cause. Brown and 1971 winner Mel Daniels are the only players to win the award while being on the losing team in the All-Star Game. Three rookies have won the award: Brown, Spencer Haywood in the 1970 All-Star Game and David Thompson in the 1976 All-Star Game. From 1968 to 1975, the game has matched the best players in the Eastern Division with the best players in the Western Division. The West has won five All-Star Game MVP awards, while the East won three. In the 1976 All-Star Game, the teams were the Denver Nuggets and the All-Stars. Denver won that All-Star Game, with Thompson as MVP.

Executive of the Year

 Denotes the year in which joint winners were named for the respective award

Honors

All-ABA Team
The All-ABA Team was an annual honor bestowed on the best players in the league following every ABA season. The team was selected in every season of the league's existence, dating back to its inaugural season in 1967–68. The All-ABA Team was composed of two five-man lineups—a first and second team, each typically consisting of two forwards, one center, and two guards. A tie has occurred only once in the  when Naismith Memorial Basketball Hall of Famers Zelmo Beaty and Dan Issel both were selected to the center position for the All-ABA Second Team.

Mel Daniels, Issel, Artis Gilmore and Julius Erving all tie for the record for the most total selections with five. Rick Barry, Donnie Freeman, Mack Calvin and Louie Dampier each have four total selections, while Larry Jones, Roger Brown, George McGinnis and Ralph Simpson follow with three total selections. Gilmore has the most All-ABA first team selections with five, while Daniels, Barry and Erving are all tied for second-most with four. A total of nine players were selected during their respective rookie years: Daniels, Spencer Haywood, Scott, Issel, Erving, Gilmore, Swen Nater, Marvin Barnes, and David Thompson.

All-Defensive Team
The All-Defensive Team was composed of a five-man lineup without regard to position. Artis Gilmore holds the record for the most selections with four, while Mike Gale, Julius Keye, Fatty Taylor, Willie Wise, Don Buse, Bobby Jones and Brian Taylor follow with two selections. Bobby Jones was the only player to be selected during his rookie year.

All-Rookie Team
The All-Rookie Team was an annual honor given to the top rookies during the regular season. The team was selected in every season of the league's existence, dating back to its inaugural season in 1967–68. The All-Rookie Team was composed of a five-man lineup.

References

American Basketball Association lists